Wu Chibing (Mandarin pronunciation: úːʈʂʰʐ̩̀ːpʲə̄ŋ) is a former badminton player from China who later represented United States in his career.

A former member of the Chinese National Badminton Team between 1987 and 1992, Wu hails from Sichuan province in China. He started his coaching career in 1992, where, he coached the Spanish National Olympic Team from 1994 to 1996 and the US National Olympic Team in 1997. He also founded New York City Badminton Club in New York in 1996 and served as the head coach. His major achievement was the bronze medal he won in 1989 World championships with then partner Yang Xinfang.

Achievements

World Championships

IBF International

References 

Badminton players from Sichuan
Living people
Chinese male badminton players
1964 births
American male badminton players